4-Piperidinone is a derivative of piperidine with the molecular formula C5H9NO. 4-Piperidone is used as an intermediate in the manufacture of chemicals and pharmaceutical drugs.

Piperidones
Piperidones are a class of chemical compounds sharing the piperidone skeleton. A classic named reaction for the synthesis of piperidones is the Petrenko-Kritschenko piperidone synthesis which involves combining an alkyl-1,3-acetonedicarboxylate with benzaldehyde and an amine. This multicomponent reaction is related to the Hantzsch pyridine synthesis.

See also
 4-Pyridone

References